Charles Ogle (1798 – May 10, 1841) was an Anti-Masonic and Whig member of the U.S. House of Representatives from Pennsylvania.

Biography
Charles Ogle (second son of Alexander Ogle and uncle of Andrew Jackson Ogle) was born in Somerset, Pennsylvania, in 1798. He studied law, was admitted to the bar in 1822 and commenced practice in Somerset. He served on the Common Pleas Bench for Lancaster County.
He graduated from Washington College (now Washington & Jefferson College) in 1817.

Political career
Ogle was elected as an Anti-Masonic candidate to the Twenty-fifth and Twenty-sixth Congresses. He was reelected as a Whig to the Twenty-seventh Congress and served until his death in Somerset in 1841. His "Gold Spoon Oration" (1840) mocked the supposed grandeur of President Martin Van Buren, contributing to the latter's loss to William Henry Harrison later that year.

He served as chairman of the United States House Committee on Roads and Canals during the Twenty-sixth Congress, but died in office of tuberculosis on 10 May 1841 in his home in Somerset, Pennsylvania.  He was buried in Union Cemetery in his hometown.

See also
List of United States Congress members who died in office (1790–1899)

Sources

1798 births
1841 deaths
People from Somerset County, Pennsylvania
American people of English descent
Anti-Masonic Party members of the United States House of Representatives from Pennsylvania
Whig Party members of the United States House of Representatives from Pennsylvania
Pennsylvania lawyers
19th-century American lawyers
Washington & Jefferson College alumni
19th-century deaths from tuberculosis
Tuberculosis deaths in Pennsylvania